Yes, Virginia... is the second studio album by American dark cabaret band the Dresden Dolls, released on April 18, 2006, by Roadrunner Records. The album was recorded in September 2005, with some extra vocal work and the mixing done the following November.

It is named after a reply to a letter run in the New York Sun in 1897 about the existence of Santa Claus (see "Yes, Virginia, there is a Santa Claus"). The first single from the album was "Sing". The album made its debut at number 42 on the US Billboard 200, selling 19,000 units in the first week; despite this, the album's sales fell off quickly, resulting in Roadrunner pulling its support for the album shortly after its release and creating tensions between the band and the label.

Other songs recorded during the studio session include "The Kill", "Boston", and "The Gardener", which were released on the No, Virginia... compilation in May 2008.

Track listing

Personnel
Amanda Palmer – vocals, piano, Mellotron, organ
Brian Viglione – drums, percussion, vocals, bass guitar, guitar
Sean Slade – producer
The Dresden Dolls – producer
Paul Q. Kolderie – mixing, engineering, producer
Adam Taylor – engineering
Holly Brewer and Matt McNiss – choir
Holly Brewer, Whitney Moses, and Mali Sastri - Delilahs
George Marino – mastering

Charts

References

The Dresden Dolls albums
2006 albums
Roadrunner Records albums
Albums produced by Paul Q. Kolderie
Albums produced by Sean Slade